"Take You Higher" is a 2011 song by Australian DJs and producers Goodwill and Hook n Sling. It is an EDM remix of the song "Big Jet Plane" by Australian duo Angus & Julia Stone. It was released in October 2011 as a single and reached the top ten in Belgium and Poland.

Music video
The music video was directed by Benn Jae and premiered in November 2011. It was filmed on the east coast of New South Wales.

Track listing
Digital promo - Europe (2011)
 "Take You Higher" - 3:09

Chart performance

Weekly charts

Year-end charts

References 

2011 songs